Inverness-shire is a historic county, registration county and lieutenancy area of Scotland. Covering much of the Highlands and Outer Hebrides, it is Scotland's largest county, though one of the smallest in population, with 67,733 people or 1.34% of the Scottish population.

Definition
The extent of the lieutenancy area was defined in 1975 as covering the districts of Inverness, Badenoch & Strathspey, and Lochaber. Thus it differs from the county in that it includes parts of what were once Moray and Argyll, but does not include any of the Outer Hebrides which were given their own lieutenancy area — the Western Isles.

Geography

Inverness-shire is Scotland's largest county, and the second largest in the UK as a whole after Yorkshire. It borders Ross-shire to the north, Nairnshire, Moray, Banffshire and Aberdeenshire to the east, and Perthshire and Argyllshire to the south.

Its mainland section covers a large area of the Highlands, bordering the Sea of the Hebrides to the west and Beauly Firth and Moray Firth to the east which provide access to the North Sea. It is split into two by the Great Glen, a roughly 60 mile geological fault which runs south-west to north-east and divides the Northwest Highlands to the west from the Grampian Mountains (including the Monadhliath Mountains) to the east. The glen contain the notable lochs of Loch Ness (Scotland's second largest), Loch Oich and Loch Lochy, which are connected by the Caledonian Canal; it opens into the south-west into the sealoch Loch Linnhe. Ben Nevis, the tallest peak in Britain, is located to the east of Fort William. The west coast consists of a number of large peninsulas divided by long loch inlets; north-to-south these are Glenelg (shared with Ross-shire), Loch Hourn, Knoydart, Loch Nevis, North and South Morar/Arisaig, Loch nan Uamh, Ardnish, Loch Ailort, Moidart and Loch Moidart. This area was traditionally referred to as the Rough Bounds due to its remoteness and inaccessibility and it remains wild and sparsely populated today. The terrain in Inverness-shire is generally mountainous, with numerous lochs scattered throughout the county, the largest of these being: Loch Ashie, Loch Mhor, Loch Knockie, Loch Duntelchaig, Loch Ruthven, Loch Moy, Loch Alvie, Loch Insh, Loch an Eilean, Loch Killin, Loch Crunachdan, Loch Morlich, Loch Garten, Loch Einich, Loch an t-Seilich, Loch na Cuaich, Loch Coaldair, the Blackwater Reservoir, Loch Treig, Loch Ossian, Loch Laggan, Loch Spean, Loch Ericht, Loch Gulbin, Lochan na h-Earba, Loch Pattack, Loch Eilde Mòr, Loch a' Bhealaich Bheithe, Loch a' Bhealaich Leamhain, Lochan Lùnn Dà-Bhrà, Loch Bruicaich, Loch Meiklie, Loch ma Stac, Loch a' Chràthaich, Loch na Beinne Baine, Loch Lundie, Loch Garry, Loch Beannacharan, Loch Beinn a Mheadhoin, Loch Monar, Loch Mullardoch, Loch Affric, Loch Cluanie, Loch Loyne, Loch Quoich, Loch an Dubh-Lochain, Loch Arkaig, Loch Morar, Loch Beoriad, Loch Dhoire a' Ghearrain and Loch Shiel.

Inverness-shire contains numerous small islands off its west coast which form part of the Inner Hebrides. The largest of these is Skye, separated from the Inverness-shire mainland by the Sound of Sleat; popular with tourists, it is a huge, sprawling island - the second biggest in Scotland - containing numerous peninsulas and offshore islands. The small isle of Eigg is also within Inverness-shire, despite the other Small Isles being in Argyllshire. To the west, across the Little Minch, most of the Outer Hebrides fall within the county, with the notable exception of Lewis which is in Ross-shire. Further west still lie the remote islands of St Kilda, which have been uninhabited since 1930. Much further west, 230 miles from the Outer Hebrides, lies the extremely remote, uninhabitable island of Rockall, which is subject to a territorial dispute with Ireland.

Islands
An t-Eilean Meadhoin
Brinacory Island
Eilean a' Ghiuthais
Eilean a' Phidhir
Eilean Bàn
Eilean Choinneach
Eilean nam Breac

Inner Hebrides

Airor Island
Am Bi-bogha Beag
Am Bi-bogha Mhòr
Am Bord (also known as Lord Macdonald's Table)
Am Fraoch-eilean
An Dubh-sgeir
An Dubh Sgeir
An Garbh-eilean
An Glas Eilean
An t-Iasgair
Ascrib Islands
Bogh Oitir
Clac nan Ràmh
The Cleats
Clett
Corr Eilean
Cow Rock
Dubh Sgeir
Eigg
Eilean a' Chaolais
Eilean a' Choire
Eilean a' Chuilinn
Eilean a' Ghaill
Ealean a' Gharb-làin
Eilean a' Mhuineil
Eilean a' Phiobaire
Eilean Aigastan
Eilean an Eòin
Eilean an Fheidh
Eilean an Fhraoich
Eilean an Inbhire
Eilean an Sgùrra
Eilean a t-Sabhail
Eilean an t-Snidhe
Eilean Buidhe
Eilean Chathastail
Eilean Chlamail
Eilean Coille
Eilean Dà Chuain
Eilean Dearg
Eilean Fladday
Eilean Gaineamhach Boreraig
Eilean Garbh
Eilean Ghiubhais
Eilean Gobhlach
Eilean Heast
Eilean Ighe
Eilean Maol
Eilean Mhogh-sgeir
Eilean Mòr
Eilean na h-Àirde
Eilean na h-Arcairseid
Eilean na h-Oitire
Eilean na Glaschoille
Eilean nam Bairneach
Eilean nan Cabar
Eilean nan Gobhar
Eilean nan Trom
Eilean Port nam Murrach
Eilean Ràrsaidh
Eilean Raonuill
Eilean Reamhar
Eilean Ruairidh
Eilean Seamraig
Eilean Sgorach
Eilean Shamadalain
Eilean Shona
Eilean Sionnach
Eilean Thuilm
Eilean Tigh
Eilean Tioram (Loch Hourn)
Eilean Tioram (Loch Nevis)
Eilean Trodday
Eileanan Dubha
Fladda-chùain
Flod Sgeir
Gaeilavore Island
Gairbh Eilein
Garbh Eilean
Gearran Island
Glas Eilean
Griana-sgeir
Guillamon Island
Harlosh Island
Holoman Island
Isay
Lampay
Longay
Luinga Beag
Luinga Mhòr
Macleaod's Maidens
Manish Island
Meallan Odhar
Mingay
Na Gamhnachain
Ornsay
Oronsay
Pabay
Raasay
Riska Island
Roag Island
Samalaman Island
Sandaig Islands
Scalpay
Sgeir a' Chuain
Sgeir a'Ghaill
Sgeir an Fheòir
Sgeir an t-Struith
Sgeir Biodaig
Sgeir Chnapach
Sgeir Dhearg
Sgeir Dorcha
Sgeir Fhada
Sgeir Ghainmheach
Sgeir Ghlas
Sgeir Gobhlach
Sgeir Leathan
Sgeir Mhòr
Sgier na Caillich
Sgeir na h-Éireann
Sgeir nam Biast
Sgeir nam Maol
Sgeir nan Eilid
Sgeir nan Ruideag
Sgeir Shuas
Sgeir Thraid
Sgeirean Buidhe Bhorlum
Sgeirean Dubha Fhiadhach
Sgeirean Gobhlach
Sgeirean Glasa
Sgeirean Ràrsaidh
Skye
Soay
South Rona
Staffin Island
Sula Skerry
Tarner Island
Tulm Island
Wiay

Outer Hebrides

Baleshare
Barra
Barra Head (also known as Berneray)
Bearran
Benbecula
Berneray
Bhacasaigh
Bhaiteam
Bhatam
Bhorogaigh
Bhotarsaigh
Bior-eilean
Boreray
Cafuam
Caigionn
Càiream
Calabhagh
Calbhaigh (multiple islands with this name)
Callum More
Caolaigh
Causamul
Ceallasaigh Beag
Ceallasaigh Mòr
Cearstaigh
Cliasaigh Beag
Cliasaigh Mòr
Collam
Copaigh
Corr-eileanan
Crago
Craobaghan
Creag na Staid
Creag nan Sealladh
Cuidhnis
Cuidsgeir
Deasgeir
Dioraigh
Dubh-Sgeir Mhòr
Duisgeir (northern)
Duisgeir (south-east)
Duisgeir (south-west)
Dùn Àrn
Dùn Corr Mòr
Eilean a' Bhogha
Eilean a' Gheoidh
Eilean a' Ghiorr
Eilean a' Ghuail
Eilean a' Mhadaidh
Eilean a' Mhail
Eilean a' Mhòrain
Eilean Àird Rainis
Eilean an Fhèidh
Eilean an Fhraoich Miatha
Eilean an Rubha
Eilean Baile Gearraidh
Eilean Bhàlaig
Eilean Bheirean
Eilean Chàirminis
Eilean Chòdam
Eilean Chrossain
Eilean Chuidhtinis
Eilean Cuithe nam Fiadh
Eilean Direcleit
Eilean Dubh Chollaim
Eilean Dubh na Muice
Eilean Fhionnlaidh
Eilean Fhionnsabhaigh
Eilean Fuam
Eilean Iochdrach
Eilean Leathan
Eilean Lingreabhaigh
Eilean Mhànais
Eilean Mhàraig
Eilean Mhiàthlais
Eilean Mhic Caoilte
Eilean Mhic Fhionnlaidh
Eilean Mhidinis
Eilean na Cille
Eilean na Cloiche
Eilean na h-Àirigh
Eilean na Gearrabreac
Eilean na Praise
Eilean na Sgaite
Eilean na Sgùirr
Eilean nam Bridianach
Eilean nan Carnan
Eilean nan Each
Eilean nan Gamhna
Eilean nan Gearr
Eilean nan Imireachean
Eilean nan Mult
Eilean Ornais
Eilean Rainich
Eilean Reinis
Eilean Reinigeadail
Eilean Sheumais
Eilean Stocanais
Eilean Trostain
Eileana Dubha
Eileanan a' Gheòidh
Eileanan a' Ghille-bheid
Eileanan Àrda
Eileanan Chearabhaigh
Eileanan Dubha
Eileanan Iasgaich
Eileanan Stafa
Ensay
Eriskay
Fathoire
Fearamas
Fiaraigh
Fladaigh
Flodaigh Beag
Flodaigh Mòr
Flodday, Loch Maddy
Flodday (Sound of Barra)
Flodday (Vatersay)
Fodragaigh
Fuday
Fuidheigh
Fuidheigh Beag
Fuam
Fuam an Tolla
Fuam na h-Ola
Fuam Raonaid
Gàisgeir
Gàisgeir Beag
Garbh Lingeigh
Gasay
Gèarum Beag
Gearum Mòr
Gighay
Gilsaigh
Glas Eilean Mòr
Glas-eilean na Creige
Glas-sgeir
Glas Sgeir
Gloraig a' Chaimbeulaich
Gloraig Dubh
Gloraig Hùisinis
Gloraig Iosal
Gloraig Tharasaigh
Gousman
Greanamul
Greanamul Deas
Grèine Sgeir
Grèineam
Grianamul
Grimsay
Gròdaigh
Guanan
Gumersam Beag
Gumersam Mhòr
Hairteamul
Hamarsaigh
Harris (part of the larger Lewis and Harris island)
Haskeir
Hèalam
Heastam Sròmaigh
Heisgeir a-muigh
Heisgeir a-Staigh
Heisgeir Eagach
Heisteamuil
Hellisay
Hermetray
Hestam
Holaisgeir
Horaigh
Huanaraigh
Hulmatraigh
Iosaigh
Killegray
Kirkibost
Lamalum
Langa Sgeir
Lingeigh (multiple islands with this name)
Lingeigh, North Uist
Lingeigh Fhada
Liungaigh
Liursaigh Dubh
Liursaigh Glas
Lonachan
Madadh Beag
Madadh Gruamach
Madadh Mòr
Màitheigh Riabhach
Màitheigh Glas
Mail Dòmhnaich
Maragaidh Beag
Maragaidh Mòr
Màsgeir
Mealla Brù
Mile-sgeir
Mingulay
Monach Islands
Muldoanich
Nàrstaigh
North Uist
Oisteim
Oitir Bheag
Opasaigh
Or Eilean
Orasaigh (multiple islands with this name)
Orasaigh Uisgeabhagh
Pabbay (Harris)
Pabbay (Barra)
Racaisgeirean
Rangas
Righe nam Bàn
Riobhagan Mhidinis
Ronay
Ròsaigh
Rusgaigh
Saghaigh Beag
Saghaigh Mòr
Sandray
Sàrstaigh
Scalpay
Scarp
Sgarabaigh
Sgeir a' Bhuallt
Sgeir a' Chàil
Sgeir a' Chàise
Sgeir a' Cheòthain
Sgeir a' Chlogaid
Sgeir a' Chuain
Sgeir an Daimh
Sgeir an Fhèidh
Sgeir an Lèim Mhòir
Sgeir an Rubha Mhòir
Sgier Cnoc Easgann
Sgeir Cruaidh
Sgeir Dhomhnaill Chaim
Sgeir Dhubh
Sgeir Dubh Mòr
Sgeir Fhadabhig
Sgeir Fhiaclach Bheag
Sgeir Fhiaclach Mhòr
Sgeir Ghlas
Sgeir Ghobhlach
Sgeir Hal
Sgeir Liath
Sgeir Mhic Coma
Sgeir Mhic Iamain
Sgeir Mhòr
Sgeir Mhurain
Sgeir na Muice
Sgeir na Parlamaid
Sgeir na Snàthaid
Sgeir nam Bàirnichean
Sgeir nan Uibhein
Sgeir Oireabhal
Sgeir Sìne
Sgeir Tarcall
Sgeir Urgha
Sgeirean Fiaclach
Sgeirean Màs a' Mhill
Sgeirislum
Sgeotasaigh
Shillay
Siolaigh Beag
Siolaigh Mòr
Siusaigh
Sleicham
Snuasamul
Sòdaigh Bheag
Sòdaigh Mòr
Solon Mòr
Solon Beag
South Uist
Spleadhairs
Spuir
Sròmaigh
Stangram
Steisaigh (multiple islands with this name)
Stiolamair
Stiughaigh
Stiughaigh na Leum
Stulaigh
Suam
Sùnam
Sùnamul
Sursaigh
Taigh Iamain
Taitealach
Taransay
Tathanais
Thamarasaigh
Theisgeir a-muigh
Torogaigh (East)
Torogaigh (West)
Traillisgeir
Triallabreac
Triallabreac Mòr
Treanaigh
Uineasan
Vallay (Bhalaigh in Gaelic)
Vatersay
Wiay

St Kilda and Rockall

Am Plastair
Boreray
Bradastac
Dùn
Giasgeir
Hamalan
Hirta
Mina Stac
Rockall
Sgeir nan Sgarbh
Soay
Stac an Armin
Stac Biorach
Stac Dona
Stac Lee
Stac Levenish
Stac Shoaigh

Coat of arms

Inverness-shire's coat of arms is blazoned:

 Azure, in dexter chief a stag's head and in sinister chief a bull's head both erased, and in base a galley, sails furled, oars in action and flagged, all Or. Beneath the shield an escrol bearing this motto: .

The galley represents Clan Chattan, who aligned themselves under the banner of Somerled, Lord of the Isles. The stag's head comes from the crest of the Frasers of Lovat, while the bull's head comes from the crest of the MacLeods of that Ilk. The motto is in Gaelic and means "For the Good of the County".

Local government

1890–1975

Inverness-shire acquired a county council in 1890, under the Local Government (Scotland) Act 1889, and, under the same legislation, boundaries were altered to make the county a single contiguous area, transferring several exclaves of other counties to Inverness-shire.

Although the new boundaries were supposed to be valid for all purposes (unlike earlier boundaries, which were really default boundaries and not necessarily those used for any particular purpose), the burghs of Inverness, Fort William, Kingussie, which had their own town councils, retained autonomous status and were for some purposes beyond the writ of the new county council. The town of Inverness had been established as a royal burgh since the mid 12th century, Fort William, originally a Fort of that name built by the Government to keep the Highlanders in their place, around which grew up a village which became in turn Gordonsburgh, Maryburgh, Duncansburgh and latterly the town/burgh of Fort William which had been established as a burgh of barony since 1618 and Kingussie had been established as a burgh of barony since 1464. Also, use of the new boundaries for parliamentary elections was specifically excluded.

Inverness-shire County Council was originally based at Inverness Castle but moved to new offices in Ardross Street in 1963.

1975–1996
The old county councils were abolished by the Local Government (Scotland) Act 1973 and Scotland was instead governed by a two-tier system of regions and districts. Mainland Inverness-shire was split amongst four districts of the Highland region, whilst the county's territory in the Outer Hebrides was transferred to the Western Isles council area.

 1. The burgh of Inverness and the Aird and Inverness districts were merged to form the Inverness Local Government district of the Highland region.
 2. The burgh of Fort William and the Lochaber district were merged with areas from the county of Argyll (the Ardnamurchan district and the electoral divisions of Ballachulish and Kinlochleven) to form the Lochaber district of the Highland region.
 3. The Skye district was merged with an area from the county of Ross and Cromarty (the South West district) to form the Skye and Lochalsh district of the Highland region.
 4. The burgh of Kingussie and the Badenoch district were merged with areas from the county of Moray (the burgh of Grantown-on-Spey and the Cromdale district) to form the Badenoch and Strathspey district of the Highland region.
 The Barra, Harris, North Uist, and South Uist districts were merged with areas from the county of Ross and Cromarty (the burgh of Stornoway and Lewis district) to form the Western Isles council area.

Within the Highland region, local government functions were divided between the regional council and the district councils. For example, education was a regional responsibility, and housing was a district responsibility.

1996–present
In 1996, under the Local Government etc (Scotland) Act 1994, the two-tier system was abolished and the Highland region became a unitary council area.

The new unitary Highland Council adopted the areas of the former districts as management areas. Each management area was represented, initially, by area committees consisting of councillors elected from areas (groups of local government wards) corresponding to the management areas, but changes to ward boundaries in 1999 created a mismatch between committee areas and management areas.

In 2007, at the time of further changes to ward boundaries, which created 22 multi-member wards instead of 80 single-member wards, the council created a new management structure, with three new corporate management areas and 16 new ward-level management areas. Also, four of the ward-level management areas, covering the seven wards, were grouped to form an Inverness city (or Inverness and Area) management area.

The total number of Highland councillors is 80, elected by the single transferable vote system of election, which is designed to produce a form of proportional representation. Wards in the Inverness city area elect 26 of the 34 council members elected from the Inverness, Nairn and Badenoch and Strathspey corporate management area.

The city area has the Nairn ward-level management area to the east, the Badenoch and Strathspey ward-level management area to the east and south, the Ross, Skye and Lochaber corporate management area to the south, west and north, and the Moray Firth to the north.

The city area is similar but not identical to the former district of Inverness.

Civil parishes

Civil parishes are still used for some statistical purposes, and separate census figures are published for them. As their areas have been largely unchanged since the 19th century this allows for comparison of population figures over an extended period of time.

In 1854 in Inverness-shire there were 29 civil parishes; 7 part civil parishes; and 5 parliamentary parishes.

 Abernethy and Kincardine
 Alvie
 Ardersier
 Arisaig and Moidart
 Barra
 Boleskine and Abertarff
 Bracadale (on Skye)
 Cawdor part (now in Nairnshire)
 Cromdale, Inverallan and Advie
 Croy, Highland and Dalcross, Highland
 Daviot
 Dunlichity
 Dores
 Duirinish (on Skye)
 Duthil and Rothiemurchus
 Glenelg
 Harris
 Inverness and Bona
 Kilmallie
 Kilmonivaig
 Kilmorack
 Kilmuir (on Skye)
 Kiltarlity and Convinth
 Kingussie and Insh
 Kirkhill
 Laggan or Kinloch Laggan
 Moy and Dalarossie
 North Uist
 Petty
 Portree (on Skye)
 Sleat (on Skye)
 Small Isles
 Snizort (on Skye)
 South Uist
 Strath (on Skye)
 Urquhart and Glenmoriston
 Urray (partly in Ross-shire; moved there in 1891)

Many changes have taken place since the Reformation period:

 North Uist was a union of the ancient parishes of Kilmuir and Sand; South Uist of the parishes of Benbecula, Howmore and Kilpeter.
Croy and Dalcross, and Kiltarlity and Convinth, were united c. 1500.
 Abernethy and Kincardine, and Urquhart and Glenmoriston, were united at the Reformation. At the same time Petty was formed by the union of the ancient parishes of Petyn and Bracholy (or Brackley).
 Boleskine and Abertarff, and Inverness and Bona, and Daviot and Dunlichity, were united in 1618. At the same time Kirkhill was formed by a union of the ancient parishes of Wardlaw and Farnua. 
 Duthil and Rothiemurchus were united in 1630. 
 Small Isles was created from Sleat in 1726; unusually, there was no parish church and the congregation met in the schoolhouse on Eigg. There are some indications that Canna and Kildonan (Eigg) may have been medieval parishes at an earlier date.
 At some point in the 19th century Arisaig and Moidart was created out of Ardnamurchan parish (the rest of this parish lay in Argyllshire). Arisaig (aka Kilmorie) and another parish, Eilean Fhianain, were medieval parishes united to Ardnamurchan at the Reformation.
 Portree was created out of parts of Snizort and Kilmuir parishes in 1726.
Kingussie and Insh, and Moy and Dalarossie, were united at an unknown date.
Minginish (Skye) was absorbed into Bracadale; Trumpan was absorbed into Duirinish; Uig was absorbed into Snizort; Rodel was absorbed into Harris; Kilmaluoc (Raasay) was absorbed into Snizort or Kilmuir.

Transport

The Highland Main Line connects Inverness by rail to Perth to the south, Kyle of Lochalsh to the west and Thurso/Wick to the north. The West Highland Line connects Fort William to Mallaig.  The Inverness to Aberdeen main line also serves Nairn within the Highland Council's area.

The Isle of Skye is connected to the mainland by a bridge from Kyle of Lochalsh in Ross-shire.

Various bus companies serve the larger towns of the county, such as Stagecoach Group and Scottish Citylink. Shiel Buses operate local buses in the Fort William area. Stagecoach operate several bus routes on the Isle of Skye.

Numerous ferries connect the islands of the Outer Hebrides to each other and also the Inner Hebrides and the Scottish mainland.

There are three airports in the county: Inverness, Benbecula and Barra. All three operate flights within Scotland, with Inverness also providing flights to other cities in the UK as well as some destinations in Europe. Barra Airport is famous within aviation circles as it is the only airport in the world where scheduled flights use a beach as the runway.

Settlements

Mainland

Abriachan
The Aird
Altrua
Ardersier
Arisaig
Aviemore
Ballifeary
Balloch
Balnafettack
Beauly
Boat of Garten
Bught
Bunree
Cannich
Carrbridge
Clachnaharry
Cradlehall
Crown
Croy
Culcabock
Culduthel
Culloden
Dalneigh
Dalwhinnie
Dores
Drakies
Drumnadrochit
Dulnain Bridge
Fort Augustus
Fort William
Foyers
Glenelg
Glenfinnan
Haugh
Highbridge
Hilton
Holm
Inchmore
Insh
Inshes
Inverfarigaig
Invergarry
Inverie
Inverlochy
Invermoriston
Kiltarlity
Kilvean
Kincraig
Kingussie
Kinlochmore
Kinmylies
Kirkhill
Laggan, Badenoch
Laggan, Great Glen
Leachkin
Lochailort
Lochardil
Longman
Mallaig
Merkinch
Millburn
Milton of Leys
Morar
Moy
Muir of Ord (shared with Ross-shire)
Muirtown
Nethy Bridge
Newtonmore
North Ballachulish
Onich
Raigmore
Roybridge
Scorguie
Smithton
South Kessock
Spean Bridge
Struy
Tomatin
Tomich
Upper Achintore
Westhill

Islands

Achachork (Skye)
Aird of Sleat (Skye)
Allasdale (Barra)
Amhuinnsuidhe (Harris)
Ardhasaig (Harris)
Ardheisker (North Uist)
Ardmore (Barra)
Ardvasar (Skye)
Ardveenish (Barra)
Armadale (Skye)
Ashaig (Skye)
Askernish (South Uist)
Auratote (South Uist)
Bail' Iochdrach (Benbecula)
Baile Glas (Grimsay)
Balgarva (South Uist)
Balivanich (Benbecula)
Bernisdale (Skye)
Bogach (Barra)
Bornesketaig (Skye)
Boreraig (Skye)
Bornish (South Uist)
Borreraig (Skye)
Borrodale (Skye)
Borsham (Harris)
Borve (Barra)
Borve (Harris)
Borve (Skye)
Bracadale (Skye)
Brevig (Barra)
Broadford (Skye)
Brogaig (Skye)
Bualintur (Skye)
Camastianavaig (Skye)
Camuscross (Skye)
Caolas (Vatersay)
Carbost (Loch Harport, Skye)
Carbost (Trotternish, Skye)
Carinish (North Uist)
Castlebay (Barra)
Claigan (Skye)
Cleadale (Eigg)
Colbost (Skye)
Daliburgh (South Uist)
Drumfearn (Skye)
Drynoch (Skye)
Dunan (Skye)
Duntulm (Skye)
Dunvegan (Skye)
Eabost (Skye)
Edinbane (Skye)
Elgol (Skye)
Ellishadder (Skye)
Eynort (Skye)
Eyre (Skye)
Fasach (Skye)
Feorlig (Skye)
Ferindonald (Skye)
Fiskavaig (Skye)
Flashader (Skye)
Flodigarry (Skye)
Galmisdale (Eigg)
Galtrigill (Skye)
Garafad (Skye)
Geary (Skye)
Gedintailor (Skye)
Gillen (Skye)
Glendale (Skye)
Halistra (Skye)
Harlosh (Skye)
Heaste (Skye)
Howmore (South Uist)
Hushinish (Harris)
Inverarish (Raasay)
Iochdar (South Uist)
Isleornsay (Skye)
Kensaleyre (Skye)
Kilaulay (South Uist)
Kilbride (Skye)
Kilmaluag (Skye)
Kilmarie (Skye)
Kilmore (Skye)
Kilmuir (Skye)
Kilvaxter (Skye)
Kingsburgh (Skye)
Kyleakin (Skye)
Kylerhea (Skye)
Lealt (Skye)
Leverburgh (Harris)
Lochboisdale (South Uist)
Lochmaddy (North Uist)
Lower Breakish (Skye)
Luib (Skye)
Luskentyre (Harris)
Milovaig (Skye)
Mugeary (Skye)
Newtonferry (North Uist)
Northbay (Barra)
Nunton (Benbecula)
Ollach (Skye)
Ose (Skye)
Peinachorran (Skye)
Portnalong (Skye)
Portree (Skye)
Ramasaig (Skye)
Rèinigeadal (Harris)
Roag (Skye)
Rodel (Harris)
Sconser (Skye)
Skeabost (Skye)
Sligachan (Skye)
Staffin (Skye)
Stoneybridge (South Uist)
Stein (Skye)
Sollas (North Uist)
Struan (Skye)
Suladale (Skye)
Talisker (Skye)
Tarbert (Harris)
Tarskavaig (Skye)
Teangue (Skye)
Tigharry (North Uist)
Torrin (Skye)
Totaig (Skye)
Tote (Skye)
Treaslane (Skye)
Trumpan (Skye)
Uachdar (Benbecula)
Uig (Duirinish, Skye)
Uig (Snizort, Skye)
Uigshader (Skye)
Ullinish (Skye)
Upper Breakish (Skye)
Vatten (Skye)

Parliamentary constituencies

There was an Inverness-shire constituency of the Parliament of Great Britain (Westminster) from 1708 to 1801 and of the Parliament of the United Kingdom (also at Westminster) from 1801 to 1918. The constituency represented, nominally, the county of Inverness minus the parliamentary burgh of Inverness, which was represented as a component of the Inverness District of Burghs constituency.

In 1918 the county constituency was divided between two new constituencies, the Inverness constituency and the Western Isles constituency. The Inverness constituency included the burgh of Inverness, other components of the district of burghs being divided between the Moray and Nairn constituency and the Ross and Cromarty constituency.

In 1983, eight years after the local government county of Inverness had been divided between the Highland region and the Western Isles council area, three new constituencies were created to cover the Highland region. The region, until 1996, and the unitary Highland council area, 1996 to present, have been covered by three constituencies since then but there were changes to boundaries and names in 1997 and 2005.

In 1999 the areas of the Westminster constituencies became also constituencies of the Scottish Parliament (Holyrood). The boundaries of Scottish Parliament constituencies have not altered since then. The Holyrood constituencies are within the Highlands and Islands electoral region.

Since 1983, Inverness has appeared in the names of Westminster and Holyrood constituencies as tabled below.

Westminster constituencies

Holyrood constituencies

See also
Politics of the Highland council area

References

 

 
Counties of Scotland
Counties of the United Kingdom (1801–1922)